Santiago Pallares Palomeque (born 4 April 1994) is an Uruguayan footballer who plays as a forward for La Luz.

Career statistics

Club

Notes

References

1994 births
Living people
Association football forwards
Uruguayan footballers
Uruguayan expatriate footballers
Competitors at the 2019 Summer Universiade
Uruguayan Primera División players
Uruguayan Segunda División players
Miramar Misiones players
Rampla Juniors players
Atlético Grau footballers
Universidad Técnica de Cajamarca footballers
La Luz F.C. players
Uruguayan expatriate sportspeople in Australia
Uruguayan expatriate sportspeople in Peru
Expatriate soccer players in Australia
Expatriate footballers in Peru